This is an incomplete list of monuments in Vushtrri municipality:

Cultural monuments

Religious monuments

Archaeological & architectural sites

Natural monuments

See also 
 Vushtrri
 List of monuments in Prizren
 Archaeological sites in the District of Mitrovica

References 

Cultural heritage of Kosovo
Lists of monuments and memorials in Kosovo
Cultural heritage monuments in Vushtrri